Mental Coach Jegal is a 2022 South Korean television series starring Jung Woo in the title role, along with Lee Yoo-mi, Kwon Yul, Park Se-young, and Moon Yoo-kang. It aired from September 12 to November 1, 2022, on tvN's Mondays and Tuesdays at 22:30 (KST) time slot.

Synopsis
A former Taekwondo athlete, who is permanently banned from the national team, becomes a mental coach to help players in slump, heal retired athletes and fight a real match against the absurd world of winner-take-all.

Cast

Main
 Jung Woo as Jegal Gil, a mental healthcare coach and a former national Taekwondo athlete who quits sports due to an unprecedented scandal.
 Lee Yoo-mi as Cha Ga-eul, a gold medalist short-track speed skater who aims to overcome a slump and to make a comeback.
 Kwon Yul as Gu Tae-man, head of the Human Rights Center of the Sports Council and a former Taekwondo Olympic gold medalist.
 Park Se-young as Park Seung-ha, a psychiatrist from the national sports team's psychological support team.
 Moon Yoo-kang as Lee Mu-gyeol, a leading South Korean swimmer.

Supporting
 Yoon Joo-sang as Jegal Han-ryang
 Kim Do-yoon as Cha Mu-tae
 Gil Hae-yeon as Shim Bok-ja
 Cha Soon-bae as Dr. Song Ji-man
 Moon Sung-keun as Park Seung-tae
 Kim Jong-tae as Representative Kang
 Lee Jin-yi as Choi Su-ji
 Kang Young-seok as Go Young-to
 Heo Jung-min as Pistol Park (Park Hyun-soo)
 Jung Kang-hee as Oh Bok-tae
 Han Woo-yeol as Yeo Sang-goo
 Heo Jeong-do as Oh Dal-seong
 Park Han-sol as Oh Seon-ah
 Kim Si-eun as Jo Ji-young
 Kim Si-eun as Han Yeo-woon
 Noh Ah-reum as Mo Ah-reum
 Hong Hwa-yeon as Kim Moo-young 
 Kim Yoo-jung as Park Ji-soo
 Jung Gyu-soo as Chairman Go
 Lee Chul-min as Park Sang-do
 Park Chul-min as Jeon Chang-gil

Extended
 Choi Hee-jin as Choi Yeo-jeong
 Yoo Young-jae as a coach
 Lee So-hee as Oh Yeon-ji
 Song Ji-won as Shin Ye-ji
 Cha Seon-hyung as Park Seung-min
 Park Jong-hwi as Oh Jin-tae
 Park Hee-joo
 Lee Seung-min

Viewership

References

External links
  
 
 

Korean-language television shows
TVN (South Korean TV channel) television dramas
Television series by Studio Dragon
Television series by Bon Factory Worldwide
South Korean sports television series
2022 South Korean television series debuts
2022 South Korean television series endings